The Prix Athanase-David is a literary award presented annually by the government of Quebec as part of the Prix du Québec to a Quebec writer, to honour the body of his or her work.

The prize, named in honour of longtime MNA Athanase David, has a monetary value of C$30,000.

Winners

References

External links
 Winners 

French-language literature in Canada
Canadian literary awards
Prix du Québec
Awards established in 1969
1969 establishments in Quebec
Literary awards honoring writers
French-language literary awards